The girls' handball tournament at the 2010 Summer Youth Olympics in Singapore was held from 20 to 25 August at the Suntec Singapore Convention and Exhibition Centre.

Participating teams

Preliminary round

Group A

Group B

Knockout stage

Fifth place game

Angola win 76–24 on aggregate

Semifinals

Bronze medal game

Final

Final ranking

References

External links
 Results list at IHF webpage

Handball at the 2010 Summer Youth Olympics